Robert W. Harms (born February 10, 1946) is an American historian and Henry J. Heinz Professor of History & African Studies at Yale University. He is a winner of the J. Russell Major Prize.

Books
 Land of Tears: The Exploration and Exploitation of Equatorial Africa, New York: Basic Books, 2019
 The Diligent: A Voyage Through the Worlds of the Slave Trade, New York: Basic Books, 2002
 Games Against Nature: An EcoCultural History of the Nunu of Equatorial Africa, New York: Cambridge University Press, 1987 (Second edition, 1999)
 River of Wealth, River of Sorrow:  The Central Zaire Basin in the Era of the Slave and Ivory Trade, 1500-1891, New Haven:  Yale University Press, 1981
 Paths Toward the Past:  African Historical Essays in Honor of Jan Vansina, CoEditor with Joseph C. Miller, Michele D. Wagner, and David S. Newbury, Atlanta: African Studies Association Press, 1994

See also
Jan Vansina

References

1946 births
Living people
21st-century American historians
21st-century American male writers
Yale University faculty
American male non-fiction writers